The RCN Series (also known as the Lt. Leary series) is a sequence of stand-alone science fiction novels by David Drake. They center around Daniel Leary, an officer in the Republic of Cinnabar Navy (RCN), and Adele Mundy, a librarian and spy. Drake has described it as "an SF version of the Aubrey/Maturin series" by Patrick O'Brian. In contrast to the hardcore military science fiction bent of Drake's Hammer's Slammers series, these novels are more character-driven and feature political intrigue as well as battles.

The plots of the novels are based on historical incidents, often from Ancient Greece or Ancient Rome. The prologue of each book includes details of its historical basis.

Creation 
After discovering the Aubrey/Maturin novels, Drake gave some thought to space opera with two equal but very different characters as protagonists. When David Weber asked Drake for a novella to appear in the first Honorverse anthology, More Than Honor, Drake wrote a story named "A Grand Tour" about a young nobleman and his older, female tutor. Drake, Baen and Weber all liked the story, but Drake, feeling the concept needed a full-length novel to work properly, wrote With the Lightnings, which uses different characters in a similar pairing.

General plot 
The RCN Series focuses on the intertwined lives of two primary characters. Daniel Leary is a Lieutenant (promoted to Captain in the later novels) in the Republic of Cinnabar Navy, a brilliant strategist, charismatic leader, charmer of women, and also the estranged son of Speaker Corder Leary, a feared, revered and respected member of the government of the planet Cinnabar. Adele Mundy is a librarian with a deep-rooted passion for information and knowledge, which has fueled her unparalleled talents in the areas of information retrieval by any means necessary, including systems infiltration and circumventing information security. Raised in the Cinnabaran aristocracy, Mundy is also an expert pistol shot, a skill useful for surviving and avoiding aristocratic duels.

During an attempt by the totalitarian Alliance of Free Stars to stage a takeover-by-proxy of a Cinnabar ally, Mundy and Leary are pressed together by circumstance in order to serve the interests of their homeworld. Complicating matters is the fact that Mundy is living in exile from Cinnabar, after her family was executed for their part in a nearly successful treason plot against Cinnabar—a string of executions ordered by Daniel's father, Speaker Leary. Nonetheless, Daniel and Adele reach an understanding and eventually a friendship, and along with an extensive cast of characters continue their travels together in service of the RCN, defending against threats from the Alliance and others.

Technology of the RCN universe 
Interstellar travel is accomplished through the use of advanced sails on the hull of starships, which take advantage of a fictional radiation to move the crafts outside of the real universe, allowing faster-than-light travel. Sublight-speed travel is driven by a matter-antimatter annihilating "High Drive". Use of the High Drive in an atmosphere results in catastrophic reactions with unspent antimatter from the drive, so for intra-atmospheric operations, ships use plasma motors that vent reaction mass (water) from the fusion engines into rocket nozzles.

Hand and vehicle weapons are generally based on electromagnetic acceleration of projectiles, while space weaponry consists of kinetic energy missiles accelerated to a high fraction of c (thereby rendering any warhead superfluous) and point defense plasma systems. In addition to point defense, the ship-mounted plasma systems are used for close range or atmospheric ship-to-ship combat. In atmosphere, the kinetic missiles are unusable, due to their utilization of the matter-antimatter High Drive.

Bibliography 
As of 2019, the series consists of thirteen novels. The first book is available as an ebook via the Baen Free Library, and the first six can be read by downloading a ZIP archive of
the free CD image included in hardcover copies of the sixth book.

References

External links 
 "Lt. Leary Series" at Baen Ebooks; includes a link to a free copy of the first book.
 Direct link to first novel at the Baen Free Library 

Military science fiction novels
Novel series
Science fiction book series